Dear Rouge are a Juno award-winning Vancouver-based alternative rock band formed in 2012 by Drew and Danielle McTaggart.

History

Formation and early years
Drew and Danielle McTaggart were both touring musicians under separate projects. They met while in their early touring days and began dating before getting married and starting Dear Rouge. The name of the duo is derived from the name of Danielle's home town, Red Deer, Alberta, "dear" being a homophone of deer and "rouge" meaning red in French. Danielle had previously been in a duo called Gaetz Ave, named after a street in Red Deer, and then a solo venture called Elle. Drew was a member of Vancouver indie circuit band Maclean.

In April 2012, Dear Rouge independently released their debut EP Heads Up! Watch Out!, a four-song EP on their Bandcamp page, and followed up six months later with their second EP Kids Wanna Know.

In November 2012, Dear Rouge won $102,700 as the grand prize winners of the Peak Performance Project put on by the Music BC Industry Organization and CKPK-FM radio station in Vancouver.

In June 2013, Exposure Contest and Dear Rouge partnered up to present a video editing contest in support of their single, "Thinking About You", from their Kids Wanna Know EP.  The contest drew a wide social media spread, accumulating hundreds of entrants from around the world.

Black to Gold (2013-2016)

Dear Rouge released their single "I Heard I Had" on October 14, 2013.In March 2014, "I Heard I Had" charted at #3 in Alternative Rock (Mediabase), #3 in Modern Rock (Mediabase), and at #13 in Canadian Rock (BDS radio). The song also won the 2015 SOCAN Songwriting Prize, an annual competition that honours the best song written and released by 'emerging' songwriters over the past year, as voted by the public. The band released their second single "Best Look Lately" on April 22, 2014. As of September 2014, it had also cracked the Top 20 of the Canadian Alternative Rock and Modern Rock charts.

The band then signed to the Canadian branch of Universal Music Group in October 2014, and announced that their debut album Black To Gold will be released through them in early 2015. The band's next single, title track "Black To Gold", was sent to radio on January 13, 2015. The single was made available digitally on February 10 along with a pre-order for the album.

On February 2, the band announced March 30th as the release date for the album and a tour with Arkells. As of May 2015, "Black To Gold" had hit #2 on the Canadian Alt-Rock charts. Their final single from Black To Gold, "Tongues", was sent to radio on June 23, 2015, and charted on Canadian Alternative Rock throughout summer 2015.

Dear Rouge recorded the title song for the Canadian TV series Private Eyes a cover of the Hall and Oates song of the same name.

On April 2, 2016, Dear Rouge won the Juno Award for Breakthrough Group of the Year, and also performed "I Heard I Had" on the live broadcast on April 3, 2016.

That year, Danielle McTaggart also contributed vocals to David Vertesi's song "Solid Ground", on his album "Sad Dad Cruise Ship".

PHASES (2017-2019)
Dear Rouge spent most of 2017 touring while writing and recording their second album. They worked with several notable producers and writers, including Tawgs Salter, Sterling Fox, and Steve Bays.

The first single from the duo's second record, "Boys & Blondes", was released on October 27, 2017. It debuted on the Canadian Alternative Rock Charts at #20 on November 7, 2017. As of February 2018, it had peaked at #6.

On February 2, 2018, the duo announced their second record PHASES would be released on March 9, 2018. It was released to positive reviews from music publications including Exclaim! and The Spill Magazine. The album peaked on the NACC 200 at #32, and on the NACC Electronic at #9.

The second single from PHASES, "Live Through The Night", was sent to radio in May 2018. Dear Rouge announced a string of festival tour dates for the summer which was followed by their fall 2018 headlining tour with Modern Space as support. "Live Through The Night" became the band's first single to hit #1 on the Canadian Alternative Rock Charts on August 13, 2018.

Dear Rouge won Pop Artist of the Year and Songwriters of the Year for the PHASES track "Chains" at the 2018 Western Canadian Music Awards.

On March 9, 2019, the band released a deluxe version of PHASES to celebrate the 1 year anniversary of the record. The deluxe version featured the same 10 track listing plus 5 additional previously unreleased tracks; "Please Don’t Ever Settle Down", "MINE", "Basic", "Never Satisfied", and "Wanna Love". Dear Rouge then supported Arkells on the western USA dates of the Rally Cry Tour.

Spirit (2020-Present)
Dear Rouge appeared on a virtual "Canada Day House Party" festival alongside Sam Roberts Band, Dean Brody and more on July 1, 2020. The band also hosted online shows playing their records front-to-back, and mentioned they were working on new music. Over the spring of 2021 the band shared across their social media they were in the studio working on their third full-length record.

On September 1, 2021, the band shared a teaser clip across their social media and announced their new single "Fake Fame" will be released September 10, 2021. The single debuted on the Canadian Alternative Rock Charts at #26. As of January 24, 2022, it had hit #1 on the Canadian Alternative Rock Charts, the band's second single to do so.

Another new single, "Life Goes By And I Can't Keep Up" was released on October 27, 2021, along with a music video.

On January 28, 2022, the band announced their new album Spirit will be released April 8, 2022, and will contain 12 tracks. They also released the song "Small Talk" from the record along with the announcement.

Alongside the release of Spirit, the single "Gimme Spirit" was serviced to radio. Dear Rouge then supported Metric across Western Canada in August 2022.

The band announced they will be touring across Canada in the winter of 2022 with Hotel Mira as support.

Touring
The band toured across Canada in the spring of 2013, and again in the Winter of 2013, also covering Western Canada with a number of shows supporting Lights. In March 2014 the band announced another cross Canada tour supporting Fast Romantics. Throughout the summer of 2014, Dear Rouge played a number of festivals across Canada including Edgefest in Toronto, Otalith in Ucluelet, Shorefest in Vancouver, X-Fest in Calgary, Sonic Boom in Edmonton, and Rifflandia in Victoria.

The band toured Canada supporting Phantogram and Mounties throughout December 2014. The band supported Arkells on their Winter Canadian tour dates throughout Canada over February and March 2015. Summer 2015 saw them play festivals across Canada again, including the inaugural Wayhome Festival. Throughout the fall and winter of 2015, Dear Rouge headlined venues across Canada with Rah Rah and sold out many notable venues including Commodore Ballroom in Vancouver and Mod Club in Toronto. They then toured Europe in December 2015. They spent 2016 mostly writing and recording, but appeared at summer festivals like Field Trip in Toronto, and Osheaga Festival in Montreal. Dear Rouge played select dates and festivals through summer 2017.

Dear Rouge played at SXSW 2018 and then supported Lights throughout Canada in the Spring of 2018. Throughout the summer of 2018, Dear Rouge played notable slots at major festivals such as Rock The Shores in Colwood, BC, Ottawa Bluesfest, Riverfest Elora, and the inaugural SKOOKUM Festival in Vancouver, BC. Their headlining PHASES release tour began in Saskatoon, Saskatchewan, Canada, in September 2018 and ended in Seattle, WA in mid-November 2018.

The band supported Arkells on the US West Coast dates of their Rally Cry Tour through March 2019. Over the summer months, Dear Rouge played several festivals across Canada, including the inaugural Squamish Constellation Festival, and Osheaga in Montreal. The band then supported Our Lady Peace, Bush, and Live on the revival of the Summersault Festival. Dear Rouge capped off 2019 performing at the Grey Cup Festival in Calgary, Alberta.

Dear Rouge returned to playing live shows in 2021 with a performance at the Calgary Stampede. Over the summer of 2022, Dear Rouge supported Vance Joy in Vancouver and Toronto, played festivals across BC and Ontario, and then toured across Western Canada supporting Metric. The band then headlined a tour across Canada with sold out shows in St.Catharines, Toronto, and Victoria.

Awards and nominations

Discography

Studio albums
Heads Up! Watch Out! (EP) (April 24, 2012)
Kids Wanna Know (EP) (October 9, 2012)
Black To Gold (March 30, 2015)
PHASES (March 9, 2018)
Spirit (April 8, 2022)

Singles
"I Heard I Had" (October 15, 2013)
"Best Look Lately" (April 22, 2014)
"Black To Gold" (February 10, 2015)
"Tongues" (June 23, 2015)
"Boys & Blondes" (October 27, 2017)
"Live Through The Night" (May 25, 2018)
"Modern Shakedown" (January 18, 2019)
"Fake Fame" (September 10, 2021)
"Gimme Spirit" (April 8, 2022)
"Meet Me At The Rio" (August 9, 2022)

Charting history

References

External links

Dear Rouge official website

Musical groups from Vancouver
Musical groups established in 2012
2012 establishments in British Columbia
Juno Award for Breakthrough Group of the Year winners
Canadian electronic rock musical groups
Canadian musical duos